Luke Pyungse Lee (born March 22, 1959) is the Arnold and Barbara Silverman Distinguished Professor of Bioengineering, Biophysics, Electrical Engineering and Computer Science, at University of California, Berkeley.  He is founding director of the Biomedical Institute for Global Health Research and Technology (BIGHEART) at the National University of Singapore.

Lee has over 350 peer-reviewed publications and over 40 issued international patents. He is a pioneer in bionanophotonics, plasmonic resonant energy transfer (PRET), rapid photonic PCR, optofluidics, microfluidics for quantitative life sciences, and integrated molecular diagnostics systems. He was elected Fellow of the Royal Society of Chemistry in 2010 and the American Institute of Medical and Biological Engineering in 2012. Lee received the 2009 IEEE William J. Morlock Award in 2009 and the 2010 Ho-Am Prize for his discovery of PRET and the development of quantum nanobiophotonics for optical gene regulations and molecular imaging (photonic RNA switch and gene circuit). His current research interests are quantum electron transfers in living organisms, molecular diagnostics of infectious and neurodegenerative diseases, and in vitro neurogenesis, with a focus both on studying fundamental quantum nanobiology and on solving ill-defined problems of global healthcare.

Education & Career
Luke P. Lee was born the youngest of three boys in the family of a poet father, Sang Ro Lee and a midwife, Bok Soon Ha. After the death of his father, he immigrated to America with his mother and brother in 1976. Lee spent his life in Seoul attending up to 11th grade of high school. After he moved to the US, he attended Wasson high school in Colorado Springs, Colorado for 12th grade.  He received a BA in Biophysics from the University of California, Berkeley in 1996 and received his PhD in Applied Science and Technology (Applied Physics: major & Bioengineering: minor) from the University of California, Berkeley in 2000.

In 1999, he became an assistant professor of bioengineering at the University of California, Berkeley. In 2005, he became a full professor and the Lester John and Lynne Dewar Lloyd Distinguished professor of bioengineering and a professor of biophysics at Berkeley. He also served as the Chair Professor in Systems Nanobiology at the Swiss Federal Institute of Technology (ETH, Zürich) from 2006 to 2007.  Lee also has a joint appointment in the Department of Electrical Engineering and Computer Science at Berkeley. He has been the co-director of the Berkeley Sensor & Actuator Center since 1999.  He became the Arnold and Barbara Silverman Distinguished Professor in 2010 and reappointed again 2015. He was Associate President (International Research and Innovation) and Tan Chin Tuan Centennial Professor at the National University of Singapore from 2016 to 2017.

Prior to his academic career, he had over ten years of extensive R&D and industrial experience in integrated optoelectronics and superconducting electronics. In the late 80s, as a member of technical staff at TRW Inc, he worked on laser holography, quantum-well surface emitting laser, Nb-based Josephson tunnel junctions, and superconducting quantum interference device (SQUID) electronics. In the early 1990s, he worked on high-temperature SQUID magnetometers, Josephson junction devices, and biomagnetic sensors at Conductus Inc.

Selected Publications (selected from over 1000 peer-reviewed publications)

External links
http://biopoets.berkeley.edu/lee.pdf

1959 births
Living people
UC Berkeley College of Engineering faculty
Scientists from the San Francisco Bay Area
Fellows of the American Institute for Medical and Biological Engineering
University of California, Berkeley alumni
Recipients of the Ho-Am Prize in Engineering